South Aiken High School is a four-year public high school located in Aiken, South Carolina, United States.

Athletics

State championships 
 Basketball - Girls: 1985, 1988
 Golf - Boys: 1987, 1990, 2000, 2001, 2004, 2012, 2013
 Soccer - Boys: 2009
 Soccer - Girls: 2017
 Swimming - Girls: 2016
 Tennis - Boys: 1998, 1999, 2000, 2013, 2017
 Tennis - Girls: 1985, 1986, 1995, 1997

Notable alumni
 Michael Dean Perry – National Football League (NFL) defensive tackle
 Dekoda Watson – NFL linebacker
 Kevin Kisner – PGA Tour Golfer

References

External links 
   - (zoning)
 Official website

Public high schools in South Carolina
Schools in Aiken County, South Carolina
Buildings and structures in Aiken, South Carolina